Sainik Awasiya Mahavidyalaya is a military boarding high school in Nepal, formerly known as Birendra Sainik Awasiya Mahavidyalaya (Birendra Military Boarding High School) and Suping Campus. It was established in 1986 in Sallaghari, Bhaktapur. The majority of the students are from military families and also for the civilians. Some students of the Bachelor of Science degree and female students are also enrolled as day scholars. Branch schools have also been established by the army in other major cities of Nepal (Pokhara, Dharan, Chitwan, Teghari, Bansbaari, Bijeshwori, Surkhet and Bardibas).

History
In 1978, with the joint investment of the Nepali Army (then the Royal Nepalese Army) and Tribhuvan University 
, Suping Army Campus was established at Suping, Bhimphedi of Makawanpur district. With its foundation, the campus conducted classes for the intermediate level in the faculty of humanities and social science. Later, in 1981, it began classes in the faculty of science as well. The Suping Army Campus was established during the tenure of General Singha Pratap Shah, then Chief of Army Staff (COAS).

In 1986, the campus was shifted to Sallaghari, Bhaktapur, with an expansion in the secondary school level during the tenure of COAS General Satchit SJB Rana. It was then renamed Birendra Sainik Awasiya Mahavidyalaya after then King Birendra Bir Bikram Shah. Since then, the funding of the school has been looked after by Nepal Army Welfare Fund.

Branches in Nepal
 Sainik Awasiya Mahavidyalaya, Pokhara
 Sainik Awasiya Mahavidyalaya, Chitwan
 Sainik Aawasiya Mahvidyalaya, Dharan
 Sainik Aawasiya Mahavidyala, Surkhet
 Sainik Aawasiya Mahvidyalaya, Kailali
 Bjeshwori Gyan Mandir Sainik Mahavidhyalaya, Bijeshwori, Swoymabhu, Kathmandu
 Sainik Awasiya Mahavidhyalaya, Bardibas, Mahotari
 Ripumardini Sainik Mahavidhyalaya, Bansbari, Kathmandu

Curriculum
Previously, the school used to conduct entrance examination enroll students at grade 4. Currently, the school begins at grade 6, with a competitive entrance exam and interview for limited seats according to the Quota. The school educates students from grades 6 to 10, following the government curriculum, who finally take the SEE currently SEE (Secondary Education Examination). After completing grade 10, students can choose various faculties which includes Science & Management (In both Day and Morning Shifts) & Humanities only in Day Shift with competitive entrance exam and interview. Bachelors Programs includes B.Sc. (Microbiology), BBA and BBS with similar procedure.

Administration
The institution is controlled administratively by the Nepal Army Headquarters and academically by teachers and professors. The highest officer from the military to administer SAMB is a Lt. Colonel who acts as a liaison officer. Other military staffs are designated several posts in administering the Mahavidyalaya as a whole. Major and Captain of the Army are officers who are offered such posts.

Past principals
 Hemanta SJB Rana 
 Kamal Singh Rathour
 Prof. Dr. Vinod Shrestha 
 Indu Mani Chemjong 
 Shamim A. Shamim
 Surendra Paneru
 Dal Prasad Pun

Past Liaison Officer
 Bhupal Man Adhikari
 Jeevan Thapa
 Dev Bahadur Chettri
 Anup Shah
 Santosh Karki (present)

Past Logistic Officers
 Murarai Sapkota
Pramod Karki(Present)

Sports

The school has won several tournaments from district level to national levels. It includes Football, Cricket, Taekwondo, Volleyball, Swimming, Gymnastic, Basketball, Athletics, Badminton, etc as the sports activities in the Mahavidhyalaya. It also organizes vrious national intershool events such as COAS T20 Interschool Cricket Tournament, COAS Interschool Football Tournament and many more.

Achievements
 First school to win the Coca-Cola Cup four times consecutively in 2070, 2069, 2068, 2067
Prakriti Malla Thakuri of Grade 8 won the best handwriting competition in all Nepal handwriting competition and allso won the title of th ebest hindwriting all over the world.
Sandip Pandit of (19th  SchoolBatch) won Best Player in 6th Korean Ambassador National Taekwondo Championship in Poomsae Category held in Kathmandu, Nepal on Dec 17-19, 2013 jointly organized by The Embassy of the Republic of Korea and The Nepal Taekwondo Association.
Sujan Shrestha(27th School Batch) won Bronze Medal in Nepal Open International Virtual Taekwondo Championship on December, 2021 jointly organized among 30 foreign countries.

References

External links
Official website
Alumni community
Sallaghari Alumni Association

Schools in Nepal
Military academies of Nepal
1986 establishments in Nepal